A list of films produced in Brazil in 2004 (see 2004 in film):

2004

See also
2004 in Brazil
2004 in Brazilian television

References 

2004
Films
Brazil